Those Damned Savages is a Canadian drama film, directed by Jean Pierre Lefebvre and released in 1971. A satirical critique of colonialism, the film explores its thesis that racist attitudes toward First Nations have not changed through a narrative that places various real historical figures from the 17th century in modern-day Montreal.

The film stars Rachel Cailhier as Tékacouita, a young Mohawk woman in New France who is taken to the city by coureur de bois Thomas Hébert (Pierre Dufresne) to work as a domestic servant, after being forcibly separated from her fiancé. In Montreal, Thomas forces Tékacouita to work as a go-go dancer in a nightclub, where she repeatedly deals with attempted sexual assault and other modern problems until her fiancé arrives to save her.

The film's cast also includes Nicole Filion as Jeanne Mance, Luc Granger as abbé Frelaté and Marcel Sabourin as Jean Talon.

The film premiered in the Directors' Fortnight program at the 1971 Cannes Film Festival.

References

External links
 

1971 films
1971 drama films
Canadian drama films
Films directed by Jean Pierre Lefebvre
First Nations films
1970s French-language films
French-language Canadian films
1970s Canadian films